Mohammad Oraz (Kurdish: Mihemed Ewraz, ; 1969 in Naghadeh, Iran – September 7, 2003 in Islamabad, Pakistan) was an Iranian mountain climber. He was the second Iranian climber after Hooman Aprin to conquer Mount Everest, reaching the summit in 1998.

Biography 

Oraz was born in September 1969, in Naghadeh, West Azerbaijan.

Oraz accompanied the writer Rory Stewart for three months during his walk across Iran.

In 2003, during an attempt to ascend Gasherbrum I, Oraz and his colleague, Moqbel Honarpajouh, were hit by an avalanche. The pair were transferred to Shifa Hospital in Islamabad, Honarpajouh survived but Oraz died 20 days later on 7 September.

Successful ascents 

Oraz's major climbs included:

 1998, Rakapushi, Pakistan.
 1998, Everest, Nepal.
 2000, Cho Oyu, Nepal, without oxygen.
 2000, Shishapangma, China, without oxygen.
 2001, Makalu, Nepal, without oxygen.
 2001, Ararat, Turkey.
 2002, Lhotse, Nepal, without oxygen.
 2003, up to 7900m of Gasherbrum I, Pakistan.

References

External links 

 Mohammad Oraz Profile at Iran Mountain Zone
 http://www.soma-digest.com/Direje.aspx?Soma=&Jimare=47&Babet=LatestNewsAnalysis

Mountaineering deaths
Iranian mountain climbers
Summiters of Mount Everest
People from Naqadeh
1969 births
2003 deaths
Sport deaths in Pakistan
Kurdish mountain climbers
Urmia University alumni
Kurdish sportspeople
Mount Ararat
Iranian summiters of Mount Everest